Wills is an outback locality in the Shire of Boulia, Queensland, Australia.

Geography 
Wills is in the Channel Country. All watercourses in this area are part of the Lake Eyre drainage basin, and most will dry up before their water reaches Lake Eyre.

The predominant land use is grazing on native vegetation.

The locality of Boulia is an "island" within Wills, which is contrary to the locality boundary principles of the Queensland Government.

Education 
There are no schools in Wills. The nearest primary school is in Boulia. The nearest secondary schools are in Winton and Mount Isa which are both too far for a daily commute. The Spinifex State College in Mount Isa offers boarding facilities. Other boarding schools or distance education would be options.

References 

Shire of Boulia
Localities in Queensland